is a Japanese footballer who plays as a goalkeeper for  club Fagiano Okayama, on loan from Kashima Antlers.

Career statistics

Club
.

References

External links

2002 births
Living people
Sportspeople from Chiba Prefecture
Association football people from Chiba Prefecture
Japanese footballers
Japan youth international footballers
Association football goalkeepers
Kashima Antlers players
Fagiano Okayama players
J1 League players
J2 League players